Harriet Ford (after marriage, Morgan; 1863 – December 12, 1949) was an American actress and playwright who flourished during the latter part of the 19th century. Her contemporaries included: Edith Ellis, Marion Fairfax, Eleanor Gates, Georgia Douglas Johnson, Margaret Mayo, Marguerite Merington, Martha Morton, Lottie Blair Parker, Josephine Preston Peabody, Mary Roberts Rinehart, Madeleine Lucette Ryley, and Rida Johnson Young.

Early life and education
Harriet French Ford was born in Seymour, Connecticut, in 1868 or 1863, the daughter of Samuel and Isabel Stoddard Ford. She was educated in the public schools of New Haven, Connecticut and Boston, Massachusetts, before she became a pupil at the Boston School of Oratory. After graduating from that institution, where her talent for recitation and acting was thought remarkable, she entered the American Academy of Dramatic Arts in New York City, graduating in two years. She also attended the Sargent Dramatic School, studying under David Belasco who prophesied for her success as an interpreter of the plays of others.

Career
Ford started her career as an actress. After six years of varied work, beginning with the chorus of She, from which Charles Frohman rescued her at rehearsal by assigning her a part in the same play, and ending with three years as a leading actress for Sol Smith Russell, convinced of her interest in the stage.

She began to write during her first year acting on the stage, while she was appearing in William Gillette's plays in London. He was her stage sponsor. Henry Morton Stanley was returning from Africa with Emin Pasha. A prize had been offered for the best poem celebrating his return, the poem to be printed on silk and read at the banquet tendered to the returning hero. Ford, having just completed her first season on the stage, won the prize from English competitors. The poem was titled, "Back from the Dead".

Ford wrote The Argyle Case and The Fourth Estate with Harvey Jerrold O'Higgins and Joseph Medill Patterson. They stated that Ford's amiability was proof that collaboration with her would inevitably end in mutual admiration. Ford stated that instead of the collaboration being a trial to the spirit, it was an absolute gain in the matter of time. “With two persons working the play is done in half the time,” she said. In fact, she and Joseph Medill Patterson wrote “The Fourth Estate” in nine days.Co-authoring The Argyle Case, and The Dummy determined her career as a writer. While on tour, she wrote monologues for the variety stage for six years. She finally stopped acting and took to writing. She called on Sarah Cowell LeMoyne, then a popular reader, and asked permission to write a monologue for her. When the monologue was completed, LeMoyne's need of it had passed, but she arranged for its sale, and Ford began writing a play for her with Beatrice deMille. It was that play, The Greatest Thing in the World, in which LeMoyne came into notability. It was her fortune to write plays for those in the early careers. Kyrle Bellew, returned after 12 years absence from the United States, came to play to a new generation and to make a new public for himself in A Gentleman from France. It was in Ford's Audrey that Eleanor Robson began her best work.

Ford wrote her first monologue for the reader Evelyne Hilliard. It was met with such success that immediately a second and third were written. They were recited by Hilliard at both public and private readings in London drawing rooms, and also in the White House. So many requests were made for the different episodes that Ford was encouraged to collect them under one cover. "Me an' Methuselar and Other Episodes " was the result. It contained ten episodes which ranged from intensely dramatic to pathetic and to the most witty and amusing. Each episode was a complete story treated with a human interest and fine delineation of character.

Ford was the author of several plays. The first was The Greatest Thing in the World, co-authored with Matilda Beatrice deMille. There followed A Gentleman of France, the “last of the swashbucklers,” as the author irreverently classified it, and described its "slaughter of eighteen”; the dramatization of Audrey, The Fourth Estate, The Little Brother of the Rich, The Argyle Case, and The Dummy. They ran the gamut from the psychological problem play to the then-modern detection of crime drama, including the romantic and business plays and the play of politics.

Personal life
She married Dr. Forde Morgan (1865–1938) in 1930; he was a medical director of Sterling Products Company.

Harriet Ford Morgan died December 12, 1949, in New York City. Her papers are held at the New York Public Library.

Selected works

 Me an' Methuselar, and other episodes, 1895
 The island impossible, 1899 (with Katharine Pyle)
 The greatest thing in the world : a play in four, 1899/1900 (with Matilda Beatrice deMille)
 "The honour of the humble" : a drama adapted from the French of Pierre Newsky , 1902 (with Pierre Newsky)
 A gentleman of France; a drama, 1902 (with Stanley John Weyman)
 Audrey, 1903 (with Ernest F. Bodington, Eugene Wiley Presbrey, Henry Hadley, Mary Johnston)
 Jacqueline. A play, 1909 (with Caroline King Duer)
 "Kidnapped", 1913 (with Harvey J. O'Higgins)
 The Wrong Number, 1921, (with Harvey J O'Higgins)
 Where Julia rules; a comedy in four acts, 1923 (with Caroline Duer) 
 The Bride. A comedy in one act, 1924 
 The happy hoboes, a comedy in one act, 1928 (with Althea Sprague Tucker)
 Where Julia rules
 Youth must be served : comedy in one act, 1927
 Mr. Susan Peters, comedy in one act, 1928
 Wanted-Money. A comedy in one act., 1928 (with Althea Sprague Tucker)
 In-laws, 1928
 What Imagination Will Do. Comedy in one act., 1928
 Mysterious money, a comedy in three acts, 1929
 What are Parents for? A play in one act., 1930
 The divine afflatus, a comedy in one act, 1931
 Are men superior? : Farce-comedy in one act, 1932
 Heroic Treatment. A comedy in one act., 1933
 Youth must be served
 The Argyle case, a play in four acts (with Harvey J O'Higgins)
 A Lady in Love (with Caroline Duer)

References

Attribution

Bibliography

External links

 
Plays by Harriet Ford and Harvey J. O'Higgins on Great War Theatre

1863 births
1949 deaths
19th-century American actresses
19th-century American women writers
19th-century American dramatists and playwrights
20th-century American women writers
20th-century American dramatists and playwrights
American stage actresses
American Academy of Dramatic Arts alumni
People from Seymour, Connecticut
Actresses from Connecticut
Screenwriters from Connecticut
20th-century American screenwriters